Negar is an Iranian movie directed by Rambod Javan. Story of the movie is written by Ehsan Godarzi.

In 35th Fajr International Film Festival, Negar has been nominated for crystal Simorgh in 9 majors.

Awards

Cast
Negar Javaherian
Mohammad-Reza Foroutan
Mani Haghighi
Atila Pesyani
Afsaneh Bayegan
Parsa Arghamy

See also
Setareh Pesyani

References

External links
 

Films shot in Tehran
Films set in Tehran
Films about revenge
2010s vigilante films
2017 crime action films
Iranian crime films